Bollmaniulus catalinae is a species of millipede endemic to Pimu (Santa Catalina Island) in California

References

Arthropods of North America
Julida
Animals described in the 20th century